Laura Anne Karpman (born March 1, 1959) is an American composer, whose work has included music for film, television, video games, theater, and the concert hall. She has won five Emmy Awards for her work. Karpman was trained at The Juilliard School, where she played jazz, and honed her skills scatting in bars.

Education
Born in Los Angeles, Karpman worked with John Harbison at the Tanglewood Music Center, and attended Aspen Music School and the Ecole des Arts Americaines, where she worked with Nadia Boulanger. She received her Bachelor of Music degree from the University of Michigan, where she graduated magna cum laude, studying with William Bolcom and Leslie Bassett. She received both her Doctorate and master's degree in Music Composition at The Juilliard School, where her principal teacher was Milton Babbitt.

Career
Compositions by Karpman have been commissioned by Tonya Pinkins, Los Angeles Opera, American Composers Orchestra, Czech Philharmonic, The Juilliard Choral Union, Pacific Serenades, and percussionist Evelyn Glennie. They have been performed internationally.

Karpman's theater catalog includes three musicals for Los Angeles's "A Noise Within" theater company, as well as underscores for dozens of classic plays. Among her media music credits are Steven Spielberg's Emmy-winning, 20-hour TV miniseries, Taken; and PBS's series The Living Edens (for which she received nine Emmy nominations). She has scored numerous films, television programs and video games (including music for Halo 3 and her award-winning score for EverQuest II). Karpman received an Annie Award nomination for A Monkey's Tale, a short film commissioned by the Chinese government, which later premiered in the US and was performed by the Detroit Symphony.

Karpman's Grammy-winning Ask Your Mama premiered at Carnegie Hall on March 16, 2009, with performances by Jessye Norman, Cassandra Wilson, The Roots, and the Orchestra of St. Luke's conducted by George Manahan. With Langston Hughes's epic poem for a libretto, Karpman's work exhibited an eclectic musical mix. Using Hughes' own voice at the core of the work, this musical includes passages from Louis Armstrong, Big Maybelle, Pigmeat Markham and Bill "Bojangles" Robinson, integrated with projected images by Rico Gatson and additional archival video, as well as Hughes's own poetry. Annie Dorsen directed it. Ask Your Mama was released by Avie Records in July 2016.

Later, Karpman created "The 110 Project", a work commissioned by the L.A. Opera as a paean to the city's first freeway, I-110, which turned 70 in 2009.

In 2014, Karpman co-founded the Alliance for Women Film Composers with Lolita Ritmanis and Miriam Cutler. The organization provides visibility and advocacy for women composers.

In 2016, Karpman became the first woman elected to the music branch of The Academy of Motion Picture Arts and Sciences Board of Governors.

In 2020, Karpman was hired to compose the score for the Marvel Studios animated anthology series What If...?.

In January 2022, Karpman was hired to compose the score for the upcoming superhero film The Marvels.

In May 2022, Karpman was set to compose the score for her third Marvel Studios outing, with the streaming series Ms. Marvel.

Personal life
Karpman is married to fellow composer Nora Kroll-Rosenbaum. They live in Playa del Rey, California, with their son.

Filmography

Films

Television

Video Games

Awards and nominations

Primetime Emmy Awards
 2021 nomination, "Outstanding Music Composition for a Series (Original Dramatic Score) - Lovecraft Country: Rewind 1921" .
 2020 won, "Outstanding Music Composition for a Documentary Series or Special (Original Dramatic Score) - Why We Hate: Tools & Tactics".
 2020 nomination, "Outstanding Original Main Title Theme Music - Why We Hate.
 2008 nomination, "Outstanding Music Composition for a Miniseries, Movie or a Special (Original Dramatic Score)" for Masters of Science Fiction: Jerry Was a Man".
 2003 nomination, "Outstanding Music Composition for a Series (Original Dramatic Score) - Odyssey 5: pilot".
The Academy of Motion Picture Arts and Sciences
 2015 Membership Induction

Annie Awards
 2007 nomination, "Best Music in an Animated Feature Production" for A Monkey's Tale

BMI Film & TV Awards
 2003 won, "BMI Cable Mini-Series Award" for Taken

G.A.N.G. Awards
 2004 won, "Best Arrangement of a Non-Original Score" for Everquest II
 2004 nomination, "Best Music of the Year" for Everquest II
The Charles Ives Award, American Academy of Arts and Letters
 1984 won

News & Documentary Emmy Awards
 2008 nomination, "Outstanding Individual Achievement in a Craft: Music and Sound" for Craft in America
 2003 nomination, "Outstanding Individual Achievement in a Craft: Music and Sound" for The Living Edens for "Big Sur: California's Wild Coast". Nomination shared with Nancy Severinsen, Clifford Hoelscher, Mark Linden, and Tara Paul.
 2001 nomination, "Outstanding Individual Achievement in a Craft – Music" for The Living Edens episode "Kamchatka: Siberia's Forbidden Wilderness".
 2000 nominations, "Outstanding Achievement in a Craft in News and Documentary Programming – Music"
 for The Living Edens episode "Costa Rica: Land of Pure Life"
 for The Living Edens episode "Palau: Paradise of the Pacific"
 1999 won, "Outstanding Achievement in a Craft in News and Documentary Programming – Music" for The Living Edens episode "Madagascar: A World Apart".
 1998 won "Outstanding Achievement in a Craft in News and Documentary Programming – Music" for The Living Edens episodes "Denali: Alaska's Great Wilderness", "Manu: Peru's Hidden Rain Forest", "Patagonia: Life at the End of the Earth".

References

Further reading
 Vivien Lejeune, "Laura Karpman Taken by Steven Spielberg", Cinefonia, No. 2, November 2003.
 Jeff Bond, "Taken With Her Music", Film Score Monthly, July 2003.
 Jon Burlingame, "Women in Showbiz: TV, Film Composer Not Confined to Any One Medium", Daily Variety, November 14, 2001.
 Jon Burlingame, "Women in Showbiz: Composers Curry Kudos", Daily Variety, November 8, 1999.
 "Fast Track—Composers Worth Listening to: Laura Karpman", The Hollywood Reporter, January 26, 1998.
 Michael Kamensky, "Spotlight: Laura Karpman", The Hollywood Reporter, January 26, 1995.
 Fred Karlin, On The Track: A Guide to Contemporary Film Scoring, 2nd edn, Routledge, 2004.
 "Composer Laura Karpman Receives 4 Emmy Nominations", Pro Sound News, 1998.
 Rudy Kopl, "Taken With Her Music", Film Score Monthly, June 1997.
 Jennifer Seidel, "Keeping Score", Electronic Musician, November 1995.
 Curt Schleier, "Composer Can't Help but Make Her Music Sound Jewish", The Jewish Transcript, June 25, 1999.
 Curt Schleier, "East of Eden", The Jewish Week, April 23, 1999.
 "Laura Karpman", The Advocate, May 2, 1995.
 K. Robert Schwartz, "A Woman of Independent Themes", Out, November 1995.
 David G. Taylor, "Duet for the Emmys", The Advocate, September 30, 2003.

By Laura Karpman:
 "An Interview with Milton Babbitt", Perspectives of New Music, vol. 24, no. 213, Spring–Summer 1986.

External links
 
 
 Ask Your Mama
 UCLA School of Theater, Film and Television: Laura Karpman

Articles and interviews
 "Settling the Score"
 "Ode to Joystick"
 "Viewpoint"

1959 births
20th-century American Jews
20th-century American women musicians
20th-century women composers
21st-century American Jews
21st-century American women musicians
21st-century women composers
American classical composers
American film score composers
American women classical composers
American women film score composers
American women in electronic music
Juilliard School alumni
LGBT classical composers
LGBT film score composers
Living people
University of Michigan School of Music, Theatre & Dance alumni
Video game composers